Gary Moorcroft (born 16 April 1976) is a former Australian rules football player for Essendon and Melbourne in the Australian Football League (AFL).

Moorcroft caught the attention of talent scouts by winning the Morrish Medal in 1994 whilst playing for the Northern Knights.

As a football player, Moorcroft was a short, stocky and explosive goalsneak who participated in a premiership with Essendon in 2000 and a Grand Final side against the Brisbane Lions in 2001. He was delisted by Essendon in 2002 after playing 95 games and struggling to retain his spot in a talented side. It was the Demons—who Essendon beat in the 2000 final, in which Moorcroft was an outstanding player—who picked him up in the 2002 AFL draft.

Moorcroft played in three losing games with the Demons and suffered a severe season-ending knee injury after a lacklustre team debut. This effectively brought an end to his chances of working his way back into the side, and he was almost immediately delisted. The then-27-year-old's 98-game, nine-year AFL career ended there.

Moorcroft is best known for winning the 2001 Mark of the Year while playing with Essendon, taking a spectacular high-flying mark in Round 14, 2001, over Western Bulldogs' forward Brad Johnson. it is considered to be the greatest mark of all time by many, including in a 2021 AFL-run poll of more than 30,000 fans, where Moorcroft won with 25% of the vote. The mark was particularly notable in that Moorcroft first jumped onto Johnson's back and then leapt even higher into the air by leveraging himself off Johnson; this is very rare, as players will usually jump onto their opponent's back and then merely hang at the same height while taking the mark (hence the colloquial term hanger for such a mark). For a similar reason, Johnson is often referred to as the springboard for this mark, while the term stepladder is used for the player underneath a hanger. Moorcroft also managed to kick six goals before half-time in the same game, including five goals in the second quarter; for reference, Moorcroft had kicked just three goals from the past nine games. His dominance in the first half was so profound that at one stage he had two players playing on him at the same time, including opposition captain Chris Grant, just to negate his impact. In fact, he had five different opponents within the first half. Moorcroft found out eight months later that he had fractured his hip in the process of his famous mark, severely limiting his career prospects.

Moorcroft spent a season at Bendigo Bombers in the VFL before retiring from AFL/VFL and moving into the local leagues. In 2005, Moorcroft joined the Silvan F.C. in the Yarra Valley Mountain Football League. During his time at Silvan, Moorcroft won four club best-and-fairest awards and broke the 100-goal mark twice, including topping the goalkicking tables of all leagues, with 163 goals in 2008 alone. In fact, this season was so dominant for Moorcroft that he had registered his 100th goal during Round 11. Of his three grand finals at Silvan, two of these were back-to-back premierships in 2007/08.

In 2009/10, Moorcroft was playing for the Romsey Redbacks in the Riddell District Football League (RDFL).

In 2011, Moorcroft joined Bundoora in the Northern Football League (NFL) and has played in three premierships with the Bulls (2011, 2013 & 2017). As a 41-year-old, he kicked the winning goal in the 2017 Grand Final. At the completion of the 2019 season, while still playing at a high level at Bundoora, and at 43 years old, Moorcroft announced his retirement from senior footy for good.

Playing statistics

|- style="background-color: #EAEAEA"
! scope="row" style="text-align:center" | 1995
|style="text-align:center;"|
| 46 || 1 || 0 || 1 || 3 || 2 || 5 || 1 || 2 || 0.0 || 1.0 || 3.0 || 2.0 || 5.0 || 1.0 || 2.0
|-
! scope="row" style="text-align:center" | 1996
|style="text-align:center;"|
| 46 || 0 || — || — || — || — || — || — || — || — || — || — || — || — || — || —
|- style="background:#eaeaea;"
! scope="row" style="text-align:center" | 1997
|style="text-align:center;"|
| 46 || 11 || 7 || 5 || 102 || 53 || 155 || 36 || 27 || 0.6 || 0.5 || 9.3 || 4.8 || 14.1 || 3.3 || 2.5
|-
! scope="row" style="text-align:center" | 1998
|style="text-align:center;"|
| 29 || 17 || 14 || 9 || 114 || 53 || 167 || 53 || 28 || 0.8 || 0.5 || 6.7 || 3.1 || 9.8 || 3.1 || 1.6
|- style="background:#eaeaea;"
! scope="row" style="text-align:center" | 1999
|style="text-align:center;"|
| 29 || 17 || 30 || 19 || 157 || 68 || 225 || 55 || 32 || 1.8 || 1.1 || 9.2 || 4.0 || 13.2 || 3.2 || 1.9
|-
! scope="row" style="text-align:center" | 2000
|style="text-align:center;"|
| 29 || 18 || 23 || 9 || 144 || 54 || 198 || 54 || 20 || 1.3 || 0.5 || 8.0 || 3.0 || 11.0 || 3.0 || 1.1
|- style="background:#eaeaea;"
! scope="row" style="text-align:center" | 2001
|style="text-align:center;"|
| 29 || 16 || 15 || 9 || 117 || 50 || 167 || 59 || 15 || 0.9 || 0.6 || 7.3 || 3.1 || 10.4 || 3.7 || 0.9
|-
! scope="row" style="text-align:center" | 2002
|style="text-align:center;"|
| 29 || 15 || 13 || 10 || 113 || 47 || 160 || 54 || 13 || 0.9 || 0.7 || 7.5 || 3.1 || 10.7 || 3.6 || 0.9
|- style="background:#eaeaea;"
! scope="row" style="text-align:center" | 2003
|style="text-align:center;"|
| 7 || 3 || 2 || 0 || 21 || 10 || 31 || 8 || 7 || 0.7 || 0.0 || 7.0 || 3.3 || 10.3 || 2.7 || 2.3
|- class="sortbottom"
! colspan=3| Career
! 98
! 104
! 62
! 771
! 337
! 1108
! 320
! 144
! 1.1
! 0.6
! 7.9
! 3.4
! 11.3
! 3.3
! 1.5
|}

References

External links

1976 births
Living people
Essendon Football Club players
Essendon Football Club Premiership players
Melbourne Football Club players
Australian rules footballers from Victoria (Australia)
Northern Knights players
Bundoora Football Club players
One-time VFL/AFL Premiership players